James Thomas Blowey (March 21, 1853 – August 1, 1934) was a politician and municipal councillor in Edmonton, Alberta.

Biography
Blowey was born in 1853 in England.  When he was a child, his family immigrated to Canada and settled in Ontario.  In 1878, Blowey moved to Old Nelson, Manitoba, and relocated to Edmonton in 1893.

In Edmonton, he started a furniture business.  In 1900, he was appointed to the Edmonton Town Council to replace Colin Strang, who had resigned.  He did not seek re-election at the conclusion of his term in 1901.

In 1906, he partnered with William Thomas Henry to form Blowey-Henry Ltd., furniture dealers.  In 1915 Henry bought out Blowey, and the latter retired to Vancouver, British Columbia, where he died August 1, 1934.  He was survived by two sons, Harry and Fresno.

James Blowey was a charter member of the Edmonton Club and the Edmonton Golf and Country Club, and was a longtime member of the Edmonton Board of Trade (now called the Edmonton Chamber of Commerce).

References

Edmonton Public Library James Blowey
City of Edmonton biography of James Blowey

1852 births
1934 deaths
Edmonton city councillors
English emigrants to Canada